Zeno Tzatzaris (born 9 May 1965) is a former Australian rules football player.

Playing career
Tzatzaris played 34 games for Footscray in the Victorian Football League between 1984 and 1990.

Knee injuries, the first of which occurred in 1985, shortened his career. One of his injuries was treated with an artificial graft shortened his career, a procedure later successfully used on Nick Malceski.

References

External links
 
 

1965 births
Australian people of Greek descent
Australian rules footballers from Victoria (Australia)
Western Bulldogs players
Living people